The Spartan Clipper was a British light touring aeroplane of the 1930s.  It was a single-engine, two-seat, low-wing monoplane with a fixed tailwheel undercarriage.

Development
H.E. Broadsmith designed the Clipper as a two-seater; he employed the outer wings of the Monospar ST-4.  Spartan Aircraft Limited built one example at their East Cowes works in 1932.  The aeroplane was initially fitted with a 75-hp Pobjoy R motor.  Registered G-ACEG it flew for the first time on 14 December 1932.  After modification to undercarriage, cabin glazing and cowling, it received a Certificate of Airworthiness on 29 June 1933.

In 1933 the Clipper was raced in the King's Cup Race.

In 1938, it was re-engined with a Pobjoy Niagara III of 90-hp, after which it was used as a company hack until 4 May 1942, when it was destroyed in an air raid on Cowes.

Specifications (Clipper)

References

1930s British civil utility aircraft
Clipper
Low-wing aircraft
Single-engined tractor aircraft
Aircraft first flown in 1932